Heflin is a village in southern Webster Parish, Louisiana, United States. The population was 245 at the 2000 census. It is part of the Minden Micropolitan Statistical Area.

On April 5, 2013, voters by a margin of 50-30 recalled Mayor Judy Tillman, a Democrat, from office. No candidate qualified to fill the mayor's office in a special election scheduled for October 19. When filing reopened, the Republican Ralph Lee James (born February 1956) filed for mayor without opposition in the October 19 election.

History

Heflin is named for Alabama native Charles Buckner Heflin (1829-1910), a veteran of the Confederate Army who thereafter operated a cotton gin and was engaged in the planting and mercantile business in south Webster Parish. Charles Heflin was for eight years a member of the Webster Parish Police Jury, the parish governing body, and the Webster Parish Democratic Executive Committee. He was affiliated with the Masonic lodge. He was the father-in-law of J. S. Bacon, a member from 1926 to 1932 of the Louisiana House of Representatives from Heflin. One of Charles Heflin's sons, William Thomas Heflin (1868-1936), a native of Webster Parish, was engaged in the timber business and was elected in 1916 as the sheriff of Winn Parish in North Louisiana.

Geography
Heflin is located at  (32.458021, -93.267589).

Demographics

As of the census of 2000, there were 245 people, 95 households, and 70 families residing in the village. The racial makeup of the village was 89.39% White, 8.98% African American, 0.41% Native American, 0.41% Asian, and 0.82% from two or more races. Hispanic or Latino of any race were 0.82% of the population.

There were 95 households, out of which 35.8% had children under the age of 18 living with them, 64.2% were married couples living together, 9.5% had a female householder with no husband present, and 25.3% were non-families. 24.2% of all households were made up of individuals, and 14.7% had someone living alone who was 65 years of age or older. The average household size was 2.58 and the average family size was 3.08.

In the village, the population was spread out, with 26.9% under the age of 18, 8.2% from 18 to 24, 27.8% from 25 to 44, 20.4% from 45 to 64, and 16.7% who were 65 years of age or older. The median age was 37 years. For every 100 females, there were 105.9 males. For every 100 females age 18 and over, there were 98.9 males.

The median income for a household in the village was $33,333, and the median income for a family was $47,083. Males had a median income of $29,167 versus $19,500 for females. The per capita income for the village was $13,547. About 5.7% of families and 8.9% of the population were below the poverty line, including 15.9% of those under the age of eighteen and 5.2% of those 65 or over.

Notable people

David B. Bolen (born 1923), track and field athlete, Olympian and diplomat was born in Heflin. He later served as the first African-American ambassador to a Soviet Bloc nation, East Germany.
Baylus Benjamin McKinney (1886–1942), a Heflin native, composed 149 Christian hymns including "The Nail-Scarred Hand", "Satisfied with Jesus", and "Wherever He Leads I'll Go". He was originally affiliated with the Bistineau Baptist Church near Heflin.

References

Villages in Louisiana
Villages in Webster Parish, Louisiana